WCW/New Japan Supershow II (known as Super Warriors in Tokyo Dome in Japan) took place on January 4, 1992, from the Tokyo Dome in Tokyo, Japan. The show was the first NJPW January 4 Dome Show, something that would become an annual tradition in NJPW and would become their  biggest show of the year. The show was also the second under the name WCW/New Japan Supershow. The show was broadcast on pay-per-view (PPV) months later in America. The US PPV broadcast did not include several of the matches of the 12-match show, with only six being broadcast in America out of a total of twelve matches.

The show featured a mixture of NJPW and WCW wrestlers facing each other. The show drew 50,000 spectators for a gate of the equivalent of $3,700,000 at the exchange rate at the time. The show featured 12 matches, including two dark matches, matches held before the PPV broadcast began. Six of the twelve bouts featured wrestlers from WCW. On the show Lex Luger successfully defended his WCW World Heavyweight Championship against Masahiro Chono, while the Japanese main event saw Riki Choshu defeated Tatsumi Fujinami. The match unified the Greatest 18 Championship and the IWGP Heavyweight Championship. Japanese heavy metal band Show-Ya performed live music between matches and performed theme music for a match where The Great Muta and Sting wrestled The Steiner Brothers. The WCW main event of the show was a tag team match between The Steiner Brothers (Rick Steiner and Scott Steiner) and the team of the top face of NJPW and WCW as The Great Muta teamed up with Sting. The show also featured WCW World Heavyweight Champion Lex Luger successfully defending the championship against NJPW representative Masahiro Chono.

The WCW/NJPW Supershows were part of a small group of WCW-produced PPVs that were not included in the "on demand" features when the WWE Network was launched in 2014.

Storylines
The event featured twelve professional wrestling matches and two pre-show matches that involved different wrestlers from pre-existing scripted feuds and storylines. Wrestlers portrayed villains, heroes, or less distinguishable characters in the scripted events that built tension and culminated in a wrestling match or series of matches.

Results

See also

1992 in professional wrestling

References

Events in Tokyo
January 1992 events in Asia
1992 World Championship Wrestling pay-per-view events
WCW/New Japan Supershow
January 4 Tokyo Dome Show
1992 in Tokyo